The Kevin Heffernan Stakes is a Melbourne Racing Club Group 3  Thoroughbred weight for age horse race, for horses aged three years old and upwards, over a distance of 1,300 metres held at Sandown Racecourse, Melbourne, Australia in mid November. Prize money for the race is A$200,000.

History
The race is named after former committeeman of the Victoria Amateur Turf Club and Melbourne Racing Club,
Kevin Heffernan, who died in 2012.

In 2013 the event was held at Caulfield Racecourse due to construction at Sandown Racecourse.

In 2021 and 2022 the race was run at Caulfield Racecourse.

Grade
 2001–2012 - Listed race
 2013 onwards  - Group 3

Distance
 2001–2003 - 1200 metres
 2004 - 1250 metres
 2005 - 1300 metres
 2006–2007 - 1200 metres
 2008–2012 - 1300 metres
 2013 - 1200 metres
 2014 onwards - 1300 metres

Winners

 2022 - Crosshaven
 2021 - Sinawann
 2020 - Kemalpasa
 2019 - Teleplay
 2018 - Cool Passion
 2017 - Jungle Edge
 2016 - Lucky Hussler
 2015 - Famous Seamus
 2014 - Fast 'n' Rocking
2013 - Lankan Rupee
2012 - Mid Summer Music
2011 - Soul
2010 - Avenue
2009 - Lucky Secret
2008 - Captain Bax
2007 - Gibraltar Campion
2006 - Tesbury Jack
2005 - Bomber Bill
2004 - Brannigan
2003 - Super Groove
2002 - Century Kid
2001 - Chattanooga
2000 - Sports

See also
 List of Australian Group races
 Group races

References

Horse races in Australia